Maggie Toulouse Oliver  (born ) is an American politician from the state of New Mexico. She is the 26th Secretary of State of New Mexico and a member of the Democratic Party. Prior to serving as Secretary of State, Toulouse Oliver was the county clerk for Bernalillo County. On April 24, 2019, Toulouse Oliver declared her candidacy for the 2020 U.S. Senate election, but she later withdrew.

Early life and career
Oliver was born around 1976 in Los Angeles but is described as a "lifelong resident" of New Mexico. She graduated from Highland High School in Albuquerque, New Mexico, in 1994, and earned her bachelor's degree in Political Science and Spanish, and her master's degree in Political Science, at the University of New Mexico. She worked as the New Mexico state director for the League of Conservation Voters, and as a political consultant and community organizer.

Political career

Bernalillo County Clerk 
Toulouse Oliver was appointed as the county clerk of Bernalillo County, New Mexico, by the county commission on January 2, 2007, to fill the unexpired term of Mary Herrera, who was elected New Mexico Secretary of State in November 2006.

As county clerk, Toulouse Oliver created a smartphone app that provides users with information about voting, such as directions to their closest voting center, hours of operation, and information about the length of the wait in line to vote. Toulouse Oliver also lead the implementation of voting centers in Bernalillo County, in an effort to reduce wait times and the need for provisional ballots.

New Mexico Secretary of State 
Following the resignation of Dianna Duran as Secretary of State, Toulouse Oliver defeated Republican Nora Espinoza in the November 2016 special election to fill the remainder of the term. She was sworn into the position on December 9, 2016.

As Secretary of State, Toulouse Oliver has modernized the voter registration system in New Mexico, and advocated for automatic voter registration and same-day voter registration, both of which are now law in the state. Toulouse Oliver also instituted New Mexico's first sexual harassment prevention trainings for lobbyists.

She has advocated for and enacted stronger campaign finance disclosure rules, bringing greater transparency to independent political spending in New Mexico. Toulouse Oliver has lobbied and advocated for open primary elections and ranked choice voting.

Toulouse Oliver founded New Mexico's Native American Voting Task Force, which works to increase voter turnout in Native American communities in New Mexico. The task force has worked together with the League of Women Voters to create voter guides for use in native communities. Toulouse Oliver also refused to turn over voter information to President Trump's Advisory Commission on Election Integrity, citing security, legal, and privacy concerns related to voters’ confidential information such as Social Security numbers, birthdates, and voting history.

Toulouse Oliver has advocated for elections security, and has ensured that the state of New Mexico employs many election security best practices, including the use of paper ballots and post-election audits. The office of the Secretary of State recently created a full-time dedicated cybersecurity staffer to “make sure [people] know that their votes are counted and their voices are heard." In 2018, Toulouse Oliver testified as an expert witness before the U.S. House Oversight and Government Reform Committee on elections security and cybersecurity issues. In 2017, she was a founding member of the Elections Government Sector Coordinating Council, which works with the Department of Homeland Security to inform policy on elections as critical national infrastructure.

Toulouse Oliver sits on the board of the New Mexico Martin Luther King Jr. Commission, the Public Employees Retirement Association board, and the Commission of Public Records board.

Awards and recognition 
In 2016, Toulouse Oliver  was named one of the EMILY's List Gabrielle Giffords Award nominees.

As New Mexico's Secretary of State, Toulouse Oliver was named the Treasurer and Elections Committee Co-Chair of the National Association of Secretaries of State, and was awarded Election Administrator of the Year by FairVote, both in 2018. Her office was awarded the New Mexico Family Friendly Business Award in 2017, 2018, and 2019. She was awarded the Election Assistance Commission's annual “Clearie” award in February 2019 for her work to make elections more accessible to blind and visually impaired voters.

In 2018, she was named as a W.K. Kellogg Foundation Leadership Network Fellow, and in 2019 she was named as a Hunt-Kean Leadership Fellow at the Hunt Institute.

United States Senate campaign
Toulouse Oliver was seen as a potential 2020 candidate for the United States Senate. After Tom Udall announced that he would not seek re-election in 2020, Toulouse Oliver said she was "seriously considering" a run for the Senate seat, and launched her campaign on April 24, 2019. On October 29, 2019, Toulouse Oliver dropped out of the race, endorsing her former rival Ben Ray Luján, who went on to win the election.

Electoral history

References

External links

Government website

Year of birth missing (living people)
Living people
21st-century American politicians
21st-century American women politicians
County clerks in New Mexico
New Mexico Democrats
Politicians from Albuquerque, New Mexico
Secretaries of State of New Mexico
University of New Mexico alumni
Women in New Mexico politics
Candidates in the 2020 United States Senate elections